DuWayne Johnsrud (born September 4, 1943) is an American Republican politician and farmer from Wisconsin.

Background 
Born in Boscobel, Wisconsin, Johnsrud was a farmer. He served in the Wisconsin State Assembly from 1985 to 2003. Johnsrud is also a competitive tobacco-spitter. In 1998, he placed fifth in a tobacco-spitting contest held in Westby, Wisconsin.

References

People from Boscobel, Wisconsin
Farmers from Wisconsin
1943 births
Living people
21st-century American politicians
Republican Party members of the Wisconsin State Assembly